The Tongzhi Emperor (27 April 1856 – 12 January 1875), born Zaichun of the Aisin Gioro clan, was the ninth Emperor of the Qing dynasty, and the eighth Qing emperor to rule over China proper. His reign, from 1861 to 1875, which effectively lasted through his adolescence, was largely overshadowed by the rule of his mother, Empress Dowager Cixi. Although he had little influence over state affairs, the events of his reign gave rise to what historians call the "Tongzhi Restoration", an unsuccessful modernization program.

Life
The only surviving son of the Xianfeng Emperor and Empress Dowager Cixi, the Tongzhi Emperor was namesake to the attempted political reform initiated by his mother, called the Tongzhi Restoration. His first regnal name was "Qixiang" (祺祥; Manchu: Fengšengge sabingga), but this name was later changed, as per tradition upon his succession, to "Tongzhi". The regnal name means 'order and prosperity' coming from the Confucian teaching that "there are many ways of being a good government, and they can all be summarized as order and prosperity".

The Tongzhi Emperor became emperor at the age of five upon the death of his father, the Xianfeng Emperor. His father's choice of a regent, Sushun, was removed in favor of a partnership between his mother Empress Dowager Cixi and Empress Dowager Ci'an.

While there had most likely been hopes that the Tongzhi Emperor would become a successful leader like the Kangxi Emperor (who ascended the throne as a child in 1661), those hopes would soon be disappointed, as the Tongzhi Emperor grew up to become an obstinate and dissolute young man who also expressed his dissatisfaction with his mother Empress Cixi.

In the fall of 1872, the teenage emperor married Empress Xiaozheyi and two official concubines. The Tongzhi Emperor apparently had wanted to take up power immediately, prompting a quarrel at court regarding the dismantling of the regency and the timing of it. However, the two empresses dowager stuck by the intended date of February 23, 1873.

The day after the Tongzhi Emperor took up the reins of power, the foreign powers requested an audience with the teenage emperor. The request precipitated a sharp disagreement between the ministers at the foreign legations, who made it clear that they would not perform the ritual kowtow to the emperor, and the Zongli Yamen (foreign affairs ministry), regarding the protocol to be observed. The Qing government was also loath to hold the audience within the confines of the Forbidden City, eventually settling on the "Pavilion of Purple Light" at one of the lakeside palaces to the west of the Forbidden City, which is now part of Zhongnanhai. The audience was finally held on 29 June 1873. After the audience, however, the foreign representatives made clear their annoyance at being received in a hall initially used by the Qing emperors to receive envoys of tributary states.

In the fall of 1874, the Tongzhi Emperor got into a clash with his ministers, which included his two uncles, Prince Gong and Prince Chun, largely over the emperor's plans to rebuild the Old Summer Palace at a time in which the empire was bankrupt, and over his dissolute behavior. The emperor reacted by firing the ministers, but Empresses Dowager Ci'an and Cixi intervened, and he had them reinstated. That December, it was announced that he was ill with smallpox, and the Empress Dowagers resumed the regency. He died on 12 January 1875, leaving no sons to succeed him.

The Tongzhi Emperor's death left the court in a succession crisis as he was childless. Eventually, the empresses dowager designated the Tongzhi Emperor's three-year-old cousin, Zaitian, as the heir to the throne. Zaitian was biologically Prince Chun's son, but was symbolically adopted as the Xianfeng Emperor's son to make him eligible to succeed the Tongzhi Emperor. Zaitian was thus enthroned as the Guangxu Emperor, with Empresses Dowager Ci'an and Cixi resuming their roles as regents. Empress Alute, Tongzhi's wife, refused to eat after his death and died seventy days after he did in an act of marital piety.

The Self-Strengthening Movement
The inspiration for the future Self-Strengthening Movement arose from the notion that China's defense in the face of war and rebellion must come from within, as the superior man strengthens himself under imperative of Heaven's robust action. The costs of war and rebellion dictated that the Qing dynasty undertake vigorous measures to ensure its survival. Moreover, the very survival of China itself was now at stake.

Self-strengthening efforts evolved in a succession of stages over a period of almost half a century. In 1840 Imperial Commissioner Lin Zexu, impressed by the power of British warships in the initial battles of the Opium War, advocated adoption of Western naval technology. The paddle-wheel steamer Nemsis had run circles around cumbersome Chinese war junks. Some Chinese at first believed the paddle-wheels were powered by men inside the ship, but soon came to appreciate the power of steam, Commissioner Lin was the first self-strengthener.

Self-strengthening enterprises, including arsenals, shipyards, and technical schools, were now established in the principal treaty ports where access to Western technology was most direct. By 1860, the overwhelming bulk of the Chinese scholarly class had become cognizant of the enormity of changes that were taking place due to the increasingly prevalent Western presence in China. They now proclaimed that change was irresistible and advocated for deeper studies of Western technology. Many reforms were proposed and implemented such as the Self-Strengthening Movement, but ultimately the failure of reforms was due to multiple factors such as political machinations.

Family 
Empress

 Empress Xiaozheyi, of the Arute clan (孝哲毅皇后 阿魯特氏; 25 July 1854 – 27 March 1875), eighth cousin once removed皇后..嘉順皇后

Imperial Noble Consort

 Imperial Noble Consort Shushen, of the Fuca clan (淑慎皇貴妃 富察氏; 24 December 1859 – 13 April 1904)慧妃→皇貴妃..敦宜皇貴妃
 Imperial Noble Consort Gongsu, of the Arute clan (恭肅皇貴妃 阿魯特氏; 20 September 1857 – 14 April 1921)珣嬪→珣妃..珣貴妃→珣皇貴妃→莊和皇貴妃
 Imperial Noble Consort Xianzhe, of the Hešeri clan (獻哲皇貴妃 赫舍里氏; 2 July 1856 – 3 February 1932)瑜嬪→瑜妃..瑜貴妃→瑜皇貴妃→敬懿皇貴妃
 Imperial Noble Consort Dunhui, of the Sirin Gioro clan (敦惠皇貴妃 西林覺羅氏; 6 September 1856 – 18 May 1933)瑨貴人→瑨嬪..瑨妃→瑨貴妃→榮惠皇貴妃

Ancestry

See also

 Family tree of Chinese monarchs (late)
 Dungan Revolt (1862–1877)

References

Citations

Sources 

 
 Sterling Seagrave, Dragon Lady .
 Daily life in the Forbidden City, Wan Yi, Wang Shuqing, Lu Yanzhen. .
 Forbidden City: The Great Within, Second Edition. May Holdsworth, Caroline Courtauld. .

Further reading

 Jung Chang, Empress Dowager Cixi: The Concubine Who Launched Modern China, (2013) .
 Mary Clabaugh Wright. The Last Stand of Chinese Conservatism: The T'ung-Chih Restoration, 1862-1874. (Stanford: Stanford University Press,  1957).
 

1856 births
1875 deaths
1850s in China
1860s in China
1870s in China
19th-century Chinese monarchs
Child monarchs from Asia
Deaths from smallpox
Qing dynasty emperors